Batyrshin is a Tatar masculine surname, its feminine counterpart is Batyrshina. It may refer to
Rafael Batyrshin (born 1986), Russian ice hockey defenseman
Ruslan Batyrshin (born 1975), Russian ice hockey player, brother of Rafael
Yana Batyrshina (born 1979), Russian rhythmic gymnast 

Tatar-language surnames